Random Album Title is the third studio album by Canadian electronic music producer Deadmau5, released by Ultra Records and Mau5trap on September 2, 2008. The album includes the singles "Faxing Berlin", "Not Exactly" and "I Remember" (with Kaskade). Following the success of "I Remember" in the UK, Random Album Title later entered the UK Albums Chart at number 31 in May 2009.

Songs
The track "Slip" is named after its hook, which intentionally falls out of time with the beat and melody of the song.

The original mix of "Faxing Berlin" is 8:37 compared to the mixed album version's length, which is only 2:36. Combined with its preceding acoustic piano intro on the continuous mix version it is 4:15. On the unmixed version, both these tracks are replaced by the original mix.

The track "Arguru" was written in memory of Juan Antonio Arguelles Rius (nicknamed Arguru), an audio software developer and musician. The composition of the 2010 song "I Said" by deadmau5 and Chris Lake (who also co-wrote "Arguru") would later be similar to the song.

Track listing

In popular culture
The track "Brazil (2nd Edit)" has been used numerous times by other artists. Kylie Minogue sampled the song in the sessions for her album Aphrodite in an unreleased song named "Change Your Mind". Alexis Jordan also used the song on her single, "Happiness". It has also been used by Taio Cruz in his song "Touch the Sky". It was used as part of a remixed mash-up of it and Haley Gibby's 2010 song "Falling in Love" as "Falling in Love With Brazil." The first edit of "Brazil" has seen no official release but can be found online on sites such as YouTube.

Charts

Certifications

References

2008 albums
Deadmau5 albums
Ministry of Sound albums
Ultra Records albums
Mau5trap albums
Juno Award for Dance Recording of the Year recordings